The Battle of Milazzo was a naval battle fought in 888 between the Byzantine and Aghlabid fleets off northeastern Sicily. The battle was a major Aghlabid victory. It is sometimes known as the Second Battle of Milazzo, counting the Battle of Stelai as the First Battle of Milazzo.

Battle
In 888, the Aghlabids mounted a new expedition aimed at Byzantine Calabria, with ships from Sicily as well as Ifriqiya. Off Milazzo, the fleet met a Byzantine squadron of the Imperial Fleet of Constantinople. The ensuing battle is not mentioned by any Byzantine source, but only by Ibn Idhari's al-Bayan al-Mughrib as well as the Cambridge Chronicle. Both agree that it was a crushing Aghlabid victory—their first in open sea combat: reportedly 5,000 Byzantines drowned, and 7,000 in total (or 7,000 more, depending on the translation from the Arabic) were killed.

Aftermath
In the aftermath of this debacle, the Byzantines abandoned many strongholds they had held in the Val Demone, and the remainder, left without hope of Byzantine aid, concluded a truce with the Aghlabid governor of Sicily. Even the garrison and populace of Rhegion are said to have temporarily abandoned their city for fear of Aghlabid attacks.

References

Sources
 

888
880s in the Byzantine Empire
Milazzo
Milazzo
Milazzo
Milazzo
Milazzo
Byzantine Sicily